Blegvad is a surname. Notable people with the surname include:

Erik Blegvad (1923–2014), Danish British children's book illustrator
Peter Blegvad (born 1951), American musician, singer-songwriter, writer, and cartoonist

Danish-language surnames